A Walk with Grace is a 2019 American "faith-based" drama film, starring David Lee Smith, Stephen Baldwin, Jason London, and Ashley Bratcher, and written and directed by Nick Kellis.

Principal photography started in Lima, Ohio in June 2017. The film premiered in Wapakoneta, Ohio on October 30, 2019.

Cast
 Ashley Bratcher as Grace
 David Lee Smith as Nate Lassiter
 Jason London as Pastor Tom Grey
 Stephen Baldwin as Jay Thorson
 Cindy Pickett as Grandma Carol
 Joe Estevez as Dale
 Austin St. John as Duane Shaffer
 Jenni-Kate DeShon as Sabrina
 Yorke Fryer as Shawn Croft
 Nicole Dambro as Graciela
 Lance Paul as Joel
 Mishka Calderon as Chloe Lassiter
 Ian Grey as Luke Grey

References

External links
 

2019 films
American drama films
Films shot in Ohio
2019 drama films
2010s English-language films
2010s American films